The 2007 Paul Hunter Classic was a pro–am snooker tournament that took place between 23 and 26 August 2007. After two years as the Fürth German Open, this was the first time the tournament was played under the name of Paul Hunter Classic, in memory of the late player Paul Hunter.

The tournament was won by Barry Pinches, who defeated Ken Doherty 4–0 in the final.

Main draw

References

Paul Hunter Classic
2007 in snooker
2007 in German sport
August 2007 sports events in Europe